No. 600 (City of London) Squadron Royal Auxiliary Air Force is a squadron of the RAF Reserves. It was formed in 1925 and operated as a night fighter squadron during the Second World War with great distinction. After the war, 600 Squadron went on to operate jet fighters until 1957. Reactivated in 1999, 600 Squadron is the only RAF Reserve unit within the M25. It is a Headquarters Support Squadron and provides trained part-time reservists to support RAF operations around the world.

History

Formation
No. 600 (City of London) Squadron RAuxAF was formed at RAF Northolt on 14 October 1925 as a unit of the Auxiliary Air Force, equipped with Avro 504 trainers and Airco DH.9A day bombers. It moved to RAF Hendon at the end of 1926, replacing its DH.9As, veterans of the First World War, with more modern Westland Wapitis in 1929. It was designated a fighter squadron in July 1934. On the outbreak of war day and night patrols were flown, experiments with airborne radar beginning in December 1939. When the Germans invaded The Netherlands, the squadron flew patrols over the Low Countries but in view of the inadequacy of Blenheims for daylight operations, 600 Sqn was allocated to night defence only a few days later.

Second World War
In September 1940, the first Bristol Beaufighter was received, conversion being completed early in 1941. In October 1940 the squadron moved to Yorkshire and in March 1941 to south-west England, where it remained until September 1942. In November 1942, 600 Sqn moved to North Africa to provide night cover for Allied bases and shipping. It was transferred to Malta in June 1943, and in September, to Italy where it spent the rest of the war on night defence and intruder missions. Re-equipment with Mosquitoes began in January 1945 and on 21 August 1945 the squadron disbanded, having become the highest scoring night fighter squadron in the RAF.

Post-war
On 10 May 1946, 600 Sqn reformed at RAF Biggin Hill, as a day fighter squadron of the Auxiliary Air Force with Spitfires. It began to recruit during June and received its first operational aircraft in October. After receiving a De Havilland Vampire in October 1949 for jet conversion, it was allotted Meteors in March 1950 and flew these until the Royal Auxiliary Air Force disbanded this squadron and many others on 10 March 1957.

Present
Since 1999, the Squadron has provided initial and professional training to part-time reservists in a variety of RAF ground trades – Operations, Intelligence, Personnel Support, Nursing, Medical & Logistics among others. Many 600 Squadron reservists have had the privilege of literally making the headlines – from exercises in Africa, the Middle East and Malaysia, to front-line operations in Iraq, Afghanistan the Falkland's and further afield. Their involvement has run the gamut of the RAF’s More recently, our reservists mobilised from their civilian lives to assist in the planning, and on the front-lines of the response to the global pandemic – and there is likely to be more opportunities for our reservists to make a mark on history just as their predecessors did.

In the UK, Reservists from 600 Squadron have served on RAF stations, flying squadrons, at HQ Air Command, in joint operations rooms, with RAF Regiment Squadrons and in posts within the Ministry of Defence. Indistinguishable from full-time colleagues, part-time personnel have led change and success in the traditions of the unit, often gaining awards and commendations – or transferring into successful RAF Regular careers.

Meanwhile, 600 Squadron is the only RAF Reserve presence within Greater London, and with “Privileged Regiment Status” within the City of London, is regularly involved in high-profile ceremonial events there, or on the national stage. 

600 Squadron still actively seeks to recruit and train motivated men and women who live within a 50-mile radius of RAF Northolt, with or without prior armed forces experience, and who have an interest in supporting the RAF in their spare-time.

Aircraft operated

Commanding officers

Honorary air commodores

Squadron bases

See also
Richard Haine

References

Notes

Bibliography

External links

 No. 600 (City of London) Squadron on the RAF web site
 600 Squadron Association
 Bases of No. 600 Squadron during the Second World War
 History of No.'s 600–604 Squadrons at RAF Web
 Aircraft and markings of No. 600 Squadron

600 Squadron
Aircraft squadrons of the Royal Air Force in World War II
Squadrons of the Royal Auxiliary Air Force
Royal Air Force units and formations of the Battle of Britain
Military units and formations established in 1925